The 24th Assembly District of Wisconsin is one of 99 districts in the Wisconsin State Assembly. Located in southeastern Wisconsin, the district comprises the villages of Brown Deer and River Hills in Milwaukee County, as well as half of Mequon in Ozaukee County, Germantown in Washington County, and part of Menomonee Falls in Waukesha County.  The district is represented by Dan Knodl, a Republican, since January 2009.

The 24th, 22nd and 23rd districts make up Wisconsin's 8th Senate district.

List of past representatives

References 

Wisconsin State Assembly districts
Milwaukee County, Wisconsin
Ozaukee County, Wisconsin
Washington County, Wisconsin
Waukesha County, Wisconsin